Giles is a bacteriophage that infects Mycobacterium smegmatis bacteria.  The genome of this phage is very different from that of other mycobacteriophages and is highly mosaic.  More than half of its predicted genes are novel and are not seen in other species.

References

External links
 Mycobacteriophage Database: Giles
 UniProt Taxonomy

Mycobacteriophages
Siphoviridae